Val d'Ansiei is a valley in the comune of Cortina d'Ampezzo in the Dolomites of the Veneto region of northern Italy. It contains the mountain refuge, Rifugio Tre Sorelle.

References

Valleys of Italy
Geography of Cortina d'Ampezzo